Alexander Clapper is a male former swimmer who competed for England.

Swimming career
Clapper was the British champion over 200 metres breaststroke in 1994. He represented England in the breaststroke events, at the 1994 Commonwealth Games in Victoria, British Columbia, Canada.

He swan for the City of Coventry Swimming Club.

References

English male swimmers
Swimmers at the 1994 Commonwealth Games
Commonwealth Games competitors for England
British male breaststroke swimmers
1974 births
Living people